The Operators are a British indie rock band. Their songs include "Mountain", "Just My Way" and "It Grinds".

History
The band formed on the Isle of Wight in 2006 and after coming in second in the Wight Noize Auditions in June, won the opportunity to play at the Isle of Wight Festival. Their debut album 'What You See Is What I Sell' was self-released at the end of 2007 and in April 2008 their song "Pictures of You" won the 'Fresh Meat' competition on the Zane Lowe show, and was played every night that week on BBC Radio One.
The band headlined The Band Stand on 12 June at the 2008 Isle of Wight Festival where they showcased material from their new album.

External links
 NME New Music Profile
 An interview with the band

English indie rock groups